Myrtillocactus schenckii, also known as garambullo or vichishovo, is a species of cacti native to Oaxaca and Puebla, Mexico. Placed in the genus Myrtillocactus, it is a member of the large and diverse family Cactaceae.

References 

schenckii
Cacti of Mexico
Flora of Southern Mexico
Garden plants of North America
Drought-tolerant plants